State Route 99 (SR 99) is a  state highway that extends from Athens in Limestone County to just northeast of Anderson in Lauderdale County. Although it is signed as a north–south highway, most of its route is in an east–west direction.

Route description
The southern terminus of SR 99 is located at an intersection with U.S. Route 31 (US 31) in northeast Athens. From this point, the highway travels concurrently with Elm Street in a westerly direction through the city.  As it exits the city limits, SR 99 changes routes, becoming an extension of Market Street before heading in a northwesterly trajectory towards Mount Rozell. From there, it then travels in a westerly direction before terminating at SR 207 northeast of Anderson.

Major intersections

See also

References

099
Transportation in Limestone County, Alabama
Transportation in Lauderdale County, Alabama